Montree Promsawat (born 27 August 1995) is a Thai professional footballer who plays as a winger for Thai League 1 club Chiangrai United .

International career
In August 2017,He won the Football at the 2017 Southeast Asian Games with Thailand U23.

International Goals

U23

Honours

International
Thailand U-23
 SEA Games  Gold Medal (1); 2017
Thailand U-21
 Nations Cup (1): 2016

References

External links
 

1995 births
Living people
Montree Promsawat
Association football wingers
Montree Promsawat
Montree Promsawat
Montree Promsawat
Montree Promsawat
Montree Promsawat
Southeast Asian Games medalists in football
Footballers at the 2018 Asian Games
Competitors at the 2017 Southeast Asian Games
Montree Promsawat